The 1931 Montana Grizzlies football team represented the University of Montana in the 1931 college football season as a member of the Pacific Coast Conference (PCC). The Grizzlies were led by first-year head coach Bunny Oakes, played their home games at Dornblaser Field and finished the season with a record of one win and six losses (1–6, 0–5 PCC).

Schedule

References

Montana
Montana Grizzlies football seasons
Montana Grizzlies football